The Bottle Conjuror was the stage name given to an anonymous theatrical performer, advertised to appear at the Haymarket Theatre in England, on 16 January 1749.  While on stage, the acrobat was to have placed his body inside an empty wine bottle, in full view of the audience.  Following a non-appearance, the audience rioted and gutted the theatre.

History

Background

Although the identity of the hoax's perpetrator is unknown, several authors consider John Montagu, 2nd Duke of Montagu, to have been responsible.  While in the company of other noblemen, the Duke was reported to have made a bet that, with an advertisement claiming that a man could "creep into a quart bottle", he could fill a theatre.  The event was advertised in several London newspapers and was soon the talk of the town.

Performance
In front of a huge audience, which included the king's second son, the Duke of Cumberland, the theatre lights were brought up at about 7 pm.  With no music to keep them entertained, the crowd grew restless and began to voice their discontent.  A theatre employee appeared from behind the curtain and told the audience that, if the performer did not appear, their money would be refunded.  One member of the audience reportedly shouted that if the audience paid double, the conjurer would fit himself into a pint bottle.

As the crowd grew more restless, someone threw a lighted candle onto the stage.  Most of the audience—including the Duke—took this as their cue to leave, some "losing a cloak, others a hat, others a wig, and swords also".  A group of angry spectators stayed inside and gutted the theatre.  Benches were ripped up, scenery was destroyed and boxes were demolished.  Debris was dragged into the street and burnt on a bonfire.

Aftermath
Suspicion immediately fell upon the theatre's manager, Samuel Foote, for having originated the hoax.  Foote claimed he knew nothing about the performance, but that he had warned the theatre's owner, John Potter, that he suspected something was not quite correct.  Potter himself fell under suspicion, but was apparently innocent, "a strange man" having dealt with all the arrangements that night.

The "Man in the Bottle" instantly became the target of the newspapers and pamphlets, who published cutting satires about the conjurer's non-appearance, and its consequences. Many satirical prints were produced, among them two caricatures published within the month: The Bottle-Conjuror from Head to Foot, without equivocation, and English Credulity; or ye're all bottled. One newspaper explained the non-appearance of the conjurer by claiming that he had been ready to perform on the night, but was asked for a private audience beforehand; whereupon receiving a demonstration of the trick, the viewer had "corked up the bottle, whipped it in his pocket and made off."

References
Notes

Bibliography

 
 
 
 

Hoaxes in the United Kingdom
Theatre in the United Kingdom
18th-century hoaxes
1749 in England